A Song for My Father is an anthology of songs performed by the children of popular American musicians of the 20th century. Each performer chose a song associated with their parent.   

The album was originally released in 2007 by 180 Music, and was an exclusive US release, available only from Target stores. On June 1, 2010, it was re-released by 429 Records.

Track listing

References

External links 
 180 Music 
 429 Records

2007 compilation albums
2010 compilation albums
Tribute albums
Works about families